Sheffield City Council elections took place on Thursday 3 May 2012  as part of the 2012 United Kingdom local elections.

There were 28 seats up for election, one third of the council.  The last election in 2011 gave Labour a majority over the Liberal Democrats with 49 councillors.  However, one Independent councillor joined Labour after the election, giving the party 50 seats.

Four main parties fielded a full slate of 28 candidates. UKIP also put up a full slate, but Steve Moxon was disendorsed as the party's candidate for Dore and Totley. Labour were defending 11 seats, all of which they successfully held in 2011.  The Liberal Democrats were defending 16 seats, 10 of which they lost to Labour in 2011.  The Greens were defending 1 seat, which they held in 2011. The Conservatives, UKIP and the smaller parties had no councillors.

Election Result

The Labour Party gained ten seats from their position following the 2008 election, but this included a seat gained already gained from the Liberal Democrats via defection in Gleadless Valley.

This result had the following consequences for the total number of seats on the council after the elections:

Ward results

Arbourthorne

Beauchief & Greenhill

Beighton

Birley

Broomhill

Burngreave

Central

Crookes

Darnall

Dore & Totley
 
 
  

 
 
 
 

 
Steve Moxon was disendorsed by UKIP prior to the election, but still appeared on the ballot paper as the UKIP candidate.

East Ecclesfield

Ecclesall

Firth Park

Fulwood

Gleadless Valley
 

 
  
 
 
 
 
 

The result in Gleadless Valley did not change the numbers on the council, as the sitting Liberal Democrat councillor had previously defected to Labour.

Graves Park
 
 
 
 

 

 

 

 Turnout percentage figure for Graves Park ward is not from official source. Calculated as (total votes/electorate)

Hillsborough

Manor Castle

Mosborough

Nether Edge

Richmond

Shiregreen & Brightside

Southey

Stannington

Stocksbridge & Upper Don

Walkley

West Ecclesfield

Woodhouse

By-elections between 2012 and 2014

Death of Liberal Democrat Cllr Janice Sidebottom.

 

Death of Labour Cllr John Robson.

References

2012
2012 English local elections
2010s in Sheffield